St Edmund's Church, Fenny Bentley is a Grade II* listed parish church in the Church of England in Fenny Bentley, Derbyshire.

History

The church dates from around 1300. It was restored between 1847 and 1850 by Henry Isaac Stevens and Frederick Josias Robinson. The west tower was rebuilt in 1864. New stained glass windows were installed in 1892 by Edward Reginald Frampton. It contains a 16th-century stone screen and the Elizabethan tombs of Thomas Beresford (died 1473) and his wife, upon which the effigies are shown bundled up in shrouds, possibly because the sculptor had no likeness to work from.

Parish status

The church is in a joint parish with
St Michael and All Angels’ Church, Alsop-en-le-Dale
St Peter's Church, Parwich
St Leonard's Church, Thorpe
St Mary's Church, Tissington

Memorials
Richard Fitzherbert (d. 1790)
Thomas Beresford (d. 1473)

Organ

The church contains a pipe organ by Brindley & Foster. A specification of the organ can be found on the National Pipe Organ Register.

See also
Grade II* listed buildings in Derbyshire Dales
Listed buildings in Fenny Bentley

References

Church of England church buildings in Derbyshire
Grade II* listed churches in Derbyshire